Don't Tread is the second and last studio album released by the American hard rock supergroup Damn Yankees. It features their second highest charting single, the power ballad "Where You Goin' Now" which peaked at number 20. The album itself reached number 22 on the Billboard 200 album chart.

Track listing
All songs written by Jack Blades, Ted Nugent and Tommy Shaw.

 "Don't Tread on Me" – 5:08
 "Fifteen Minutes of Fame" – 4:50
 "Where You Goin' Now" – 4:40
 "Dirty Dog" – 4:53
 "Mister Please" – 4:19
 "Silence Is Broken" – 5:03
 "Firefly" – 4:57
 "Someone to Believe" – 4:57
 "This Side of Hell" – 4:00
 "Double Coyote" – 4:44
 "Uprising" – 5:31
 "Come Again (Live) Japan Bonus Track
 "Bonestripper" Japan Bonus Track

Personnel

Band members
 Tommy Shaw – guitars and vocals
 Ted Nugent – guitars and vocals
 Jack Blades – bass guitar and vocals
 Michael Cartellone – drums

Additional musicians
 Robbie Buchanan – keyboards
 Tower of Power - horn section conducted by Greg Adams
 Paul Buckmaster - string arrangements, conductor

Production
Ron Nevison - producer, engineer
Craig Brock - assistant engineer
Andy Udoff - overdubs
Chris Lord-Alge - mixing
John Jackson - mixing assistant
Michael Ostin - executive producer

Chart positions
Album - Billboard (United States)

Singles - Billboard (United States)

References

External links
Heavy Harmonies page

1992 albums
Damn Yankees (band) albums
Albums arranged by Paul Buckmaster
Albums produced by Ron Nevison
Warner Records albums